The Mahaut River is a river in the Laborie Quarter of Saint Lucia.  The mouth is at the Caribbean Sea.

See also
List of rivers of Saint Lucia

Note
Mahaut River should not be confused with the stream Ravine Mahout in Laborie Quarter at

References

Rivers of Saint Lucia